Alexander Suppantschitsch (born 14 June 1972) is a former Austrian footballer and current manager. He currently manages ASKÖ Wölfnitz.

External links
 

1972 births
Living people
Austrian footballers
FC Kärnten players
Place of birth missing (living people)
Association football defenders
SK Austria Klagenfurt managers
Austrian football managers